This is a list of drama films of the 1990s.

1990
 190 Days Before the Command
 An Angel at My Table
 Cyrano de Bergerac
 Dances with Wolves
 Flatliners
 The Godfather Part III
 Ju Ppioooo
 Life Is Sweet Longtime Companion Maroko The Match Factory Girl Memories of a River Mr. and Mrs. Bridge Reise der Hoffnung Singapore Sling Song of the Exile Tilaï Vincent and Theo1991
 Banana Man The Adjuster Amantes La Belle Noiseuse Boern Natturunnar Boyz n the Hood Days of Being Wild The Double Life of Veronique Europa Europa, Europa The Fisher King The Hours and Times Hoyat Gwan Tsoi Loi Manatsu no Chikyū My Own Private Idaho Only Yesterday 
 Raise the Red Lantern Rambling Rose Regarding Henry Return to the Blue Lagoon Roja The Stranger Together Alone Center Stage1992
 Bad Lieutenant Batman Returns The Bridge Un Coeur en Hiver The Crying Game Daens Daughters of the Dust A Few Good Men Glengarry Glen Ross Howards End Lorenzo's Oil Love Field Malcolm X The Player Radio Flyer A River Runs Through It A Scene at the Sea Scent of a Woman School Ties Unforgiven Urga Wanking Rights1993
 A Bronx Tale A Class to Remember A Home of Our Own A Wall of Silence Abraham's Valley Actor Ad Fundum Alive Bloom in the Moonlight Bodies, Rest & Motion Bopha! Calendar Carlito's Way Cronos Dragon: The Bruce Lee Story Farewell My Concubine Fearless Fiorile Free Willy Guelwaar House of Cards In the Name of the Father Indecent Proposal Jack the Bear Le Jeune Werther Menace II Society Moving My Favorite Season Naked Public Access Ruby in Paradise Schindler's List Searching for Bobby Fischer Shadowlands Short Cuts Speak Up! It's So Dark Swing Kids The Age of Innocence The Blue Kite The Great Pumpkin The Man Without a Face The Piano The Remains of the Day The Scent of Green Papaya The Secret Garden The Slingshot Three Colours: Blue What's Eating Gilbert Grape1994
 Above the Rim Before the Rain A Borrowed Life Chungking Express Ed Wood Eden Valley Exotica Forrest Gump Fresh The Heart's Cry Heavenly Creatures I Like You, I Like You Very Much The Last Supper Léon: The Professional The Lion King Little Women Once Were Warriors Pom Poko Il Postino: The Postman Quiz Show Satantango The Shawshank Redemption Strawberry and Chocolate Thirty Two Short Films About Glenn Gould Three Colours: Red Three Colours: White Threesome Through the Olive Trees To Live Vanya on 42nd Street Wild Reeds1995
 The Addiction Apollo 13 The Baby-Sitters Club 
 Bombay The Bridges of Madison County La Cérémonie Clockers Cross My Heart and Hope to Die Cry, the Beloved Country Cyclo Dead Homiez Dead Man Walking Fallen Angels Good Men, Good Women La Haine Heat Leaving Las Vegas A Little Princess Maborosi Nelly & Monsieur Arnaud El pasajero clandestino Pocahontas Safe Summer Snow Whisper of the Heart White Balloon The Wife1996
 L'Appartement Breaking the Waves Color of a Brisk and Leaping Day The Crucible The English Patient Floating Life Forgotten Silver Gabbeh Gone, Gone Forever Gone Goodbye South, Goodbye Hamlet Hard Eight The Hunchback of Notre Dame Kolya Lone Star Once Upon a Time...When We Were Colored Pillow Book Ponette The Portrait of a Lady Prisoner of the Mountains Ridicule Secrets & Lies Shine A Single Spark SLC Punk! Sleepers Sling Blade Twister1997
 9 millimeter Abre los ojos (Open Your Eyes)
 All Over Me The Apostle The Boxer The Butcher Boy Buud Yam Character Dakan (Destiny)
 The Eel Good Will Hunting A Gun for Jennifer Hana-bi (Fireworks)
 Happy Together Heunggong Chaichou Hold You Tight The Ice Storm In the Company of Men Kini and Adams Lawn Dogs La vita è bella (Life Is Beautiful)
 Live Flesh A Lost Paradise Mein Herz – niemandem! Mother and Son Ossos The River A River Made to Drown In The Sweet Hereafter Taste of Cherry Titanic Under the Lighthouse Dancing1998
 Afrodita, el Jardín de Los Perfumes After Life Alegria Alice and Martin American History X The Apple Central Station Deep Impact Dil Se.. Flowers of Shanghai Gods and Monsters Happy Birthday The Harmonists My Name Is Joe The Parent Trap Pleasantville The Prince of Egypt Ratcatcher Red Violin Satya Saving Private Ryan The Silence A Simple Plan1999
 American Beauty Beau Travail The Book of Stars Boys Don't Cry Charisma The Cider House Rules The Color of Paradise Cruel Intentions The End of the Affair Eyes Wide Shut Fight Club Girl, Interrupted The Green Mile The Insider Lies Magnolia Moonlight Whispers October Sky Romance Samurai X: Trust & Betrayal See You in Hell, My Darling The Sixth Sense A Slipping-Down Life The Straight Story The Virgin Suicides The Wind Will Carry Us''

References

Drama
1990s